B. macrophylla may refer to:

 Bistorta macrophylla a flowering plant species native to China, Bhutan, India and Nepal
 Bouea macrophylla, a tropical fruit tree native to Southeast Asia

Synonyms 
 Banksia macrophylla, a synonym for Banksia robur, a plant species found in Australia

See also 
 Macrophylla